Shimmer Volumes are the DVDs produced by the all-female professional wrestling promotion Shimmer Women Athletes. Since 2005, it has had 86 releases, with the most recent releases (82-91) being two volume, two disc sets, representing one night of events each, a practice not done since the out of print special edition of volume 1-2. Each volume is intended for release on DVD but about five years behind the actual live dates, with many (including volumes 91, 100, and 109-113) appearing in Streaming VOD services in the meantime. Official information on these releases regularly appears on the Shimmer Wrestling website. To date, all but 13 of the events have been recorded live at the Berwyn Eagles Club.

Volume 1

Volume 2

Volume 3

Volume 4

Volume 5

Volume 6

Volume 7

Volume 8

Volume 9

Volume 10

Volume 11

1: Alicia substituted for Serena Deeb, who was unable to make it to the building in time for her match due to a car accident.

2: Sarah Stock was listed as an 'International Wildcard' entry, having never competed in Shimmer before.

Volume 12

Volume 13

Volume 14: Hot Summer Nights

Volume 15

Volume 16

Two-out-of-three falls match

Volume 17

Volume 18

Volume 19

 After Sara Del Rey was eliminated, she remained at ringside and pulled Ariel over the top rope to eliminate her.

Volume 20

Volume 21

Volume 22

Volume 23

Volume 24

Volume 25

Volume 26

Volume 27

Volume 28

Volume 29

Volume 30

Volume 31

Volume 32

Volume 33

Volume 34

Volume 35

Volume 36

Volume 37

Volume 38

Volume 39

Volume 40

Volume 41

Volume 42

Volume 43

Volume 44

Volume 45

Volume 46

Volume 47

Volume 48

Volume 49

Volume 50

Volume 51

Volume 52

Volume 53

Volume 54

Volume 55

Volume 56

Volume 57

Volume 58

Volume 59

Volume 60

Volume 61

Volume 62

Volume 63

Volume 64

Volume 65

Volume 66

Volume 67

Volume 68

Volume 69

Volume 70

Volume 71

Volume 72

Volume 73

Volume 74

Volume 75

Volume 76

Volume 77

Volume 78

Volume 79

Volume 80

12 Woman Tournament to crown the first Heart of Shimmer Champion.

Volume 81

Volume 82

Volume 83

Volume 84

Volume 85

Volume 86

Volume 87

Volume 88

Volume 89

Volume 90

Volume 91

Volume 92

Volume 93

Volume 94

Volume 95

Volume 96

Volume 97

Volume 98

Volume 99

Volume 100

Volume 101

Volume 102

Volume 103

Volume 104

Volume 105

Volume 106

Volume 107

Volume 108

Volume 109

Volume 110

Volume 111

Volume 112

Volume 113

Volume 114

Volume 115

Volume 116

Volume 117

Shimmer at The Collective

Volume 119

Volume 120

See also
 Shine Wrestling events
 List of NCW Femme Fatales events

References

Shimmer Women Athletes
Women's professional wrestling shows
Professional wrestling in Illinois